Jireh Ralph A. Ibañes (born April 20, 1982) is a Filipino former professional basketball player of the Philippine Basketball Association (PBA). He played his entire career for the Rain or Shine Elasto Painters and is now serving as an assistant team manager. He was drafted eleventh overall by then-known Welcoat in 2006. He is the last player to have played from the original Welcoat team of 2006–07.

Professional career
Ibañes was drafted by Welcoat Dragons in the 2006 PBA draft as the eleventh overall pick.

On January 15, 2016, in the Game 6 of the 2015–16 PBA Philippine Cup semi-finals against the San Miguel Beermen, Ibañes accidentally injured San Miguel and Philippine national team star June Mar Fajardo while boxing Fajardo out for a rebound. Ibañes was the subject of criticism of netizens (especially San Miguel fans) over the incident. However, he apologized for the incident, saying it was just an accident and had no intention to hurt Fajardo and hoped for a speedy recovery for Fajardo.

Player profile
Ibañes is arguably one of the best defenders in the PBA during his playing career often guarding the opposing team's best scorer, which helped him win the league's Defensive Player of the Year award and All-Defensive team in the 2012 and 2014 seasons.

PBA career statistics

Season-by-season averages

|-
| align=left | 
| align=left | Welcoat
| 31 || 21.9 || .439 || .269 || .576 || 2.9 || 1.2 || .5 || .6 || 6.9
|-
| align=left | 
| align=left | Welcoat
| 33 || 16.3 || .450 || .400 || .509 || 1.8 || .8 || .6 || .4 || 4.5
|-
| align=left | 
| align=left | Rain or Shine
| 43 || 13.8 || .345 || .225 || .625 || 1.7 || .8 || .4 || .3 || 3.9
|-
| align=left | 
| align=left | Rain or Shine
| 43 || 8.3 || .393 || .067 || .714 || .9 || .4 || .2 || .1 || 2.0
|-
| align=left | 
| align=left | Rain or Shine
| 31 || 10.7 || .412 || .294 || .531 || 1.1 || .9 || .2 || .2 || 3.1
|-
| align=left | 
| align=left | Rain or Shine
| 50 || 15.5 || .426 || .266 || .614 || 1.5 || .8 || .4 || .4 || 4.2
|-
| align=left | 
| align=left | Rain or Shine
| 49 || 17.4 || .460 || .259 || .479 || 2.1 || 1.2 || .6 || .2 || 4.5
|-
| align=left | 
| align=left | Rain or Shine
| 56 || 12.4 || .351 || .229 || .419 || 1.7 || .9 || .3 || .2 || 2.1
|-
| align=left | 
| align=left | Rain or Shine
| 52 || 13.7 || .406 || .281 || .686 || 1.9 || .7 || .2 || .2 || 3.8
|-
| align=left | 
| align=left | Rain or Shine
| 35 || 10.1 || .395 || .154 || .636 || 1.1 || .7 || .3 || .0 || 2.3
|-class=sortbottom
| align=center colspan=2 | Career
| 423 || 13.9 || .410 || .256 || .575 || 1.7 || .8 || .4 || .3 || 3.6

References

1982 births
Living people
Basketball players from Palawan
Filipino men's basketball players
Filipino Protestants
People from Palawan
Rain or Shine Elasto Painters players
Shooting guards
Small forwards
UP Fighting Maroons basketball players
Rain or Shine Elasto Painters draft picks